Raymond Van Dijck (12 April 1935 – 18 May 1997) was a Belgian athlete. He competed in the men's pole vault at the 1960 Summer Olympics.

References

External links

1935 births
1997 deaths
Athletes (track and field) at the 1960 Summer Olympics
Belgian male pole vaulters
Olympic athletes of Belgium